November is an upcoming Maldivian film directed by Ali Shifau. Produced by Mohamed Ali under Dark Rain Entertainment, the film stars Mohamed Jumayyil and Mariyam Majudha in pivotal roles.

Cast 
 Mohamed Jumayyil as Yamaan
 Mariyam Majudha as Ameera
 Ismail Wajeeh as Sam
 Aishath Yaadha as Zeyba
 Aminath Silna
 Tareesh Ismail
 Meynaa Hassan
 Shalabee Ibrahim
 Abdulla Sadiq
 Moosa Waseem

Development
Following the success of Vakin Loabin (2018), Dark Rain Entertainment announced the project on 23 June 2018 with lead cast as Mohamed Jumayyil and Mariyam Majudha. In July 2019, reports confirmed that actor Ali Wajeeh, who during the time was residing in Sri Lanka, will make a comeback to screen with November. Filming commenced on 1 October 2019 in Male', K. Thulusdhoo and Laamu Atoll. The remaining scenes of the film were shot in Sri Lanka. In November 2019, it was reported that Ismail Wajeeh's son, Tareesh Ismail joins the cast of November and will feature several prominent faces including Meynaa Hassan, Shalabee Ibrahim, Abdulla Sadiq and Moosa Waseem. Filming was wrapped on 26 January 2020 by shooting a flight sequence to Dh. Kudahuvadhoo.

Soundtrack
The audio of the first single of the film titled "Moosun" which was rendered by Mariyam Ashfa was released on 24 December 2020.

Release
A poster of the film was unveiled on 18 February 2020, announcing the release date as 6 July 2020. However, with the closure of movie theatres due to COVID-19 pandemic, the project was pushed.

References

Maldivian drama films
Upcoming films
Films directed by Ali Shifau
Dhivehi-language films